The W. R. Browne Medal is awarded by the Geological Society of Australia "to a person distinguished for contributions to the geological sciences in Australia." The medal is named after William Rowan Browne.

Recipients 

 1979: Edwin Sherbon Hills
 1981: Dorothy Hill
 1981: Norman Henry Fisher
 1984: Haddon King.

 1986: Germaine Joplin
 1988: Basil Balme
 1992: David Brown
 1994: Allan White
 1996: John R. De Laeter
 1998: Cecil George Murray
 2000: Alfons VandenBerg
 2002: Brenda Franklin
 2004: Ian Withnall
 2006: Ken Campbell
 2008: Jim Ross
 2010: Anthony Cockbain
 2012: John Foden
 2014: Gavin Young
 2016: Bryan Smith

References

Australian science and technology awards